Atletico Baja are a Mexican professional indoor soccer franchise playing in the Southwestern Division of the Major Arena Soccer League, representing the Mexican city of Tijuana since 2015.

History
The team was founded in 2015.

Players
As of December 20, 2016.

Active players

Inactive players

References

External links
Atletico Baja official website

Major Arena Soccer League teams
Professional Arena Soccer League teams
Association football clubs established in 2015
2015 establishments in Mexico
Sports teams in Tijuana
Association football in Tijuana
Mexican indoor football teams